Creagh Icefall is an icefall at the head of Creagh Glacier in the Wilkniss Mountains, Victoria Land. It was named by the Advisory Committee on Antarctic Names in 1994 in association with Creagh Glacier.

References
 

Icefalls of Antarctica
Landforms of Victoria Land
Scott Coast